Kato Vlasia (Greek: Κάτω Βλασία) is a mountain village and a community in the municipality of Kalavryta, Achaea, Greece. The community consists of the villages Kato Vlasia, Menychtaiika and Metochi. It is situated at about 800 m elevation. near the source of the river Selinountas, east of the highest summit of Mount Erymanthos. It is 1 km north of Ano Vlasia, 16 km southeast of Chalandritsa and 17 km west of Kalavryta.

Population

References

External links
 Kato Vlasia on GTP Travel Pages

See also

List of settlements in Achaea

Populated places in Achaea
Kalavryta